Michael Gary Brown (born March 4, 1959) is an American former professional baseball starting pitcher who played in Major League Baseball (MLB) from  through  for the Boston Red Sox (1982–) and Seattle Mariners (1986–1987).

Career
Brown was drafted in the second round of the 1980 MLB draft, the 48th pick overall out of Clemson University. He batted and threw right-handed.

Brown reached the MLB in 1982 with the Boston Red Sox, playing in part of five seasons with them before moving to the Seattle Mariners in the same transaction that brought Dave Henderson and Spike Owen to Boston. In August 1986, Brown (along with Rey Quiñones, Mike Trujillo, and a player to named later) was traded to the Seattle Mariners. The Red Sox obtained Spike Owen and Dave Henderson. In a six-season career, Brown posted a 12–20 record with 115 strikeouts and a 5.75 ERA in  innings.

After that, he served as pitching coach in Nippon Professional Baseball (NPB).

As of 2013, Brown was a professional scout, based in Naples, Florida, for the Arizona Diamondbacks of the MLB.

References

External links

Mike Brown - Baseballbiography

1959 births
Living people
American expatriate baseball people in Japan
American expatriate baseball players in Canada
Arizona Diamondbacks scouts
Baseball coaches from New Jersey
Baseball players from Camden, New Jersey
Boston Red Sox players
Bristol Red Sox players
Calgary Cannons players
Clemson Tigers baseball players
Cleveland Indians coaches
Colorado Springs Sky Sox players
Hokkaido Nippon-Ham Fighters
Major League Baseball pitchers
Major League Baseball pitching coaches
Nippon Professional Baseball coaches
Orix Buffaloes
Pawtucket Red Sox players
Rochester Red Wings players
Seattle Mariners players
Sportspeople from Camden, New Jersey
Winston-Salem Red Sox players
Winter Haven Red Sox players